Shunkō (PLH-42) is a Shunkō-class patrol vessel currently operated by the Japanese Coast Guard.

Construction and career 
Shunkō was laid down on 15 February 2018 and launched on 20 March 2019 by Mitsubishi, Shimonoseki. She was commissioned on 19 February 2020.

Gallery

References

Patrol vessels of the Japan Coast Guard
2019 ships